is a town in Aso District, Kumamoto Prefecture, Japan.

As of 2003, the town had an estimated population of 8,735 and a density of 63.76 persons per km². The total area is 137.00 km².

Sightseeing

Kitasato Shibasaburō Memorial Museum: Oguni is Kitasato's birthplace.
Tsuetate Onsen (杖立温泉)
Nuruyu Onsen (奴留湯温泉)
Nabegataki Falls (鍋ケ滝)
Sakamoto Zenzo Museum of Art

References

External links

Oguni official website 
Photos of the village including hot springs

Towns in Kumamoto Prefecture